The Kirchner Cultural Centre is a cultural centre located in Buenos Aires, Argentina. It is the largest of Latin America, and the third or fourth largest in the world.

It was opened on May 21, 2015, and is located in the former Buenos Aires Central Post Office ("Palacio de Correos"). The cultural centre was named after former president of Argentina Néstor Kirchner, who oversaw its conversion.

The nine-floor centre has a concert hall; five other auditoriums for theater and concerts; 18 halls for poetry readings, performance art, and other events; 40 rooms of art and history galleries totaling 15,000 square meters on six floors; 16 rehearsal rooms; and two rooftop terraces. It is possible to reach the centre with Line B and Line E of the city's underground, at Leandro N. Alem and Correo Central respectively.

History

Buenos Aires Central Post Office

The need for a new central post office in Buenos Aires was first raised in 1888 by the director of the Correo Argentino (Argentine Postal Service) at the time, Dr. Ramón J. Cárcano. Later that year a congressional bill providing for its construction was signed by President Miguel Juárez Celman. The Ministry of Public Works commissioned French architect Norbert Maillart for its design in 1889.

Designating a 12,500 m2 (134,000 ft²) city block on the corner of Leandro Alem and Corrientes Avenues for its construction, the Public Works Ministry chose the site as a means to beautify a land reclamation site where the shores of the Río de la Plata had reached just a decade earlier. The sudden onset of the Panic of 1890 and the subsequent crisis led to President Juárez Celman's resignation, however, as well as to the project's suspension.

The national government revived the plans only in 1905, and in 1908 Maillart returned to Buenos Aires, where his new plans for a larger post office were approved the following April. Differences later arose between Maillart and the Argentine government, and the French architect abandoned the project in 1911. Construction, which had just started, was then left to the supervision of Maillart's chief assistant, Jacques Spolsky. Spolsky reengineered the design, which featured masonry supports, to consist of a steel-reinforced concrete structure, for which 2,882 steel pillars were placed onto the bedrock, 10 m (33 ft) deep.

Limitations on the city's public works budgets resulting from the onset of World War I forced another major design alteration in 1916. The planned construction of an elevated causeway on Leandro Alem Avenue was cancelled, and a mezzanine was quickly added to the plans to compensate for an entrance which would now be one floor below the original's. Spolsky achieved this without substantial changes to the building's exterior, though the number of delays led to considerable cost overruns on the project, and its budget was exhausted in 1923. President Marcelo Torcuato de Alvear, however, obtained congressional support for a new appropriation, and on September 28, 1928 (two weeks before the end of Alvear's tenure), the new Secretaría de Comunicaciones was inaugurated.

The building's eclectic design, drawing prominently from French Second Empire architecture, was typical of the public buildings and upscale real estate built in Buenos Aires and other Argentine cities early in the 20th century. Despite their differences, Maillart went on to design the Buenos Aires National College and the Argentine Supreme Court, and Spolsky designed post offices for Rosario and San Miguel de Tucumán in a similar style while at work on this structure.

The largest public building completed in Argentina up to that point, the building measured eight stories and 60 m (200 ft) in height and included over 88,000 m2 (948,000 ft²) of indoor space. The central hall was decorated with marble throughout, features stained glass windows, numerous bronze sculptures and mail drop boxes, and a four-story-high domed ceiling.

Perón era
The grandiose setting led President Juan Perón to move his offices in the building during the early years of his 1946–55 tenure, and the First Lady, Eva Perón, designated a wing as the first headquarters of the charitable Eva Perón Foundation.

During the subsequent automobile boom in Argentina, the plaza facing the post office was made into a parking lot. Opposition to the 1979 sale of the parking lot for the construction of a local Bank of Tokyo headquarters proved insurmountable, and the plans were cancelled. Guillermo del Cioppo, the minister of urban development and later mayor, ordered the construction of an underground parking structure instead, and the lot above was converted into a park in 1983.

The building was designated a National Historic Monument in 1997. Most of its postal activities had been transferred to a newer structure during the Perón administration, and it handled only international mail in later years. In 2005, its last remaining postal bureau was closed.

Cultural centre

President Néstor Kirchner proposed the conversion of the abandoned building and landmark into a cultural centre in June 2005, and two years later, plans were approved for the construction of two concert halls and an exhibition gallery for the creation of the Bicentennial Cultural Centre (Centro Cultural del Bicentenario). The centre's winning design was provided by a team of architects led by siblings Enrique, Federico and Nicolás Bares.

It was originally scheduled to be inaugurated on the Argentina Bicentennial, May 25, 2010. Completion of the new centre was delayed considerably, however, and in 2012 its designated name was amended as Centro Cultural del Bicentenario Presidente Dr. Néstor Carlos Kirchner, in honor of the late former president. Upon opening in May 2015 it was named the shorter Centro Cultural Kirchner (English: Kirchner Cultural Centre).

When the architects added new spaces and elements, they purposely used different materials such as clear and frosted glass and stainless steel, to maintain sight of the ornate Beaux-Arts style beauty of the original building. The main concert hall La Sala Sinfonica (originally named La Ballena Azul, or "The Blue Whale"), seating 1,950 people, is a blimp-shaped three-storey auditorium and opera house floating in the former package-sorting area. It houses a Klais Orgelbau pipe organ (opus 1912), which can be played via a remote console. It has four manuals and about eight thousand pipes. It weighs 30 metric tons and features three 32' stops in pédale registers. The other principal venues are the Sala Federal for music, and La Cúpula and Sala Argentina for live theater.

Since the inauguration of President Mauricio Macri (whose father, Francisco Macri, led a conglomerate that once owned the building), the Centre became part of the newly formed Federal System of Media and Public Contents (Sistema Federal de Medios y Contenidos Publicos) and has sought to de-emphasize its function as a homage to Néstor Kirchner. The centre is now branded simply as "CCK" and the room that once housed a memorial display in honour of Kirchner has been dismantled. The Macri administration has intended to change the name of CCK to the "Bicentennial Cultural Centre" (Centro Cultural del Bicentenario). In October 2016, a bill was introduced in Congress to prohibit the federal government from naming facilities after a president who has not been dead for at least 20 years, effectively forcing CCK to be renamed upon passage and enactment of the bill.

The Argentine National Symphony Orchestra, founded by Péron in 1948 but homeless for 67 years, has taken up permanent residency at the Kirchner Centre.

As many as 10,000 patrons a day visit venues and events at the Kirchner Centre. Everything is currently free, because the Culture Ministry operates on the assumption that the arts belong to everyone — "We consider culture to be a right" — as said by former minister of culture Teresa Parodi in her interview with the U.S. National Public Radio.

President Mauricio Macri of Argentina assumed the one-year G20 presidency on 30 November 2017, during an official ceremony in Kirchner Cultural Centre, for the first time in South America.

See also

 Teatro Colón

References

External links

 

Arts centres in Argentina
Buildings and structures in Buenos Aires
Concert halls in Argentina
Museums in Buenos Aires
Opera houses in Argentina
Theatres in Buenos Aires
National Historic Monuments of Argentina
Post office buildings
Government buildings completed in 1928
1928 establishments in Argentina
Government buildings completed in 2015
2015 establishments in Argentina
Tourist attractions in Buenos Aires
Beaux-Arts architecture
Neoclassical architecture in Argentina
Second Empire architecture